Tobias Dantzig (February 19, 1884 – August 9, 1956) was an American mathematician, the father of George Dantzig, and the author of Number: The Language of Science (A critical survey written for the cultured non-mathematician) (1930) and Aspects of Science (New York, Macmillan, 1937).

Biography
Born in Shavli (then Imperial Russia, now Lithuania) into the family of Shmuel Dantzig (?-1940) and Guta Dimant (1863–1917), he grew up in Lodz and studied mathematics with Henri Poincaré in Paris. His brother Jacob (1891-1942) was murdered by the Nazis during the Holocaust; he also had a brother Naftali (who lived in Moscow) and sister Emma.

Tobias married a fellow Sorbonne University student, Anja Ourisson, and the couple emigrated to the United States in 1910. He worked for a time as a lumberjack, road worker, and house painter in Oregon, until returning to academia at the encouragement of Reed College mathematician Frank Griffin. Dantzig received his Ph.D. in mathematics from Indiana University in 1917, while working as a professor there.  He later taught at Johns Hopkins, Columbia University, and the University of Maryland.

Dantzig died in Los Angeles in 1956. He was the father of George Dantzig, a key figure in the development of linear programming.

Partial list of publications 
 Number: The Language of Science (1930); 
 Aspects of Science (1937)
 Henri Poincaré, Critic of Crisis: Reflections on His Universe of Discourse (1954)
 The Bequest of the Greeks (1955);

References

External links

1884 births
1956 deaths
American science writers
20th-century American mathematicians
Jewish American scientists
Emigrants from the Russian Empire to the United States
University of Paris alumni
Indiana University alumni
Johns Hopkins University faculty
Columbia University faculty
University of Maryland, College Park faculty
Expatriates from the Russian Empire in France